Citizens Advice Scotland (CAS), formally the Scottish Association of Citizens Advice Bureaux (SACAB), is a registered charity. Based in Edinburgh it comprises 61 member bureaux, including a national helpline. Together these free local and national services provide legal advice, practical help and information on consumer and political rights across Scotland.

CAS provides central support to local bureaux with management, research, fundraising, IT support, training and campaigning.

CAS launched a national helpline in 2005, called Citizens Advice Direct, staff were based in Glasgow city centre.

In 2012 a study showed that most of CAS's activity was the provision of advice across five areas: benefits, debt, employment, housing  and relationship. In 2012, there were concerns that five of the bureaux in Glasgow might close, however they remained open after accepting a new funding offer.

CAS has been registered as a charity since 3 August 1984, currently registered as a charitable company with the Office of the Scottish Charity Regulator (OSCR), Scottish charity number SC 016637.

References

External links
 

Charities based in Edinburgh
1975 establishments in Scotland
Organizations established in 1975
Scots law
Welfare in Scotland
Consumer rights organizations
Citizens Advice